Deserticossus sareptensis is a species of moth of the family Cossidae. It is found in the south-eastern part of European Russia.

The wingspan is about 31 mm. The forewings are light brown with a lighter area in the middle part and narrow wavy lines. The hindwings are uniform grey.

References

Moths described in 1912
Cossinae
Moths of Europe